Cornwall Island is a low ice-free island off the north coast of Robert Island in the South Shetland Islands, Antarctica. Surface area . The area was visited by early 19th century sealers operating from nearby Clothier Harbour.

The island was named in 1935 by the Discovery Investigations after Cornwall House, where the Admiralty Hydrographic Office was situated at that time.  Mónica Rock was charted by the 1949-50 Chilean Antarctic Expedition and named after the elder daughter of First Lieutenant Venturini, a member of the expedition.

Location

See also 
 Composite Antarctic Gazetteer
 List of Antarctic islands south of 60° S
 SCAR
 Territorial claims in Antarctica

References

External links
 SCAR Composite Antarctic Gazetteer.

Islands of Robert Island